Momiki Tameike  is an earthfill dam located in Miyazaki Prefecture in Japan. The dam is used for irrigation. The catchment area of the dam is 1 km2. The dam impounds about 19  ha of land when full and can store 167 thousand cubic meters of water. The construction of the dam was completed in 1914.

See also
List of dams in Japan

References

Dams in Miyazaki Prefecture